Comfort & Joy is the fourteenth overall, ninth North American, and fourth holiday album by the a cappella group Rockapella. It was re-released in 2004 on Shakariki Records.

Track listing

Personnel
Scott Leonard – high tenor
Kevin Wright – tenor
Elliott Kerman – baritone
George Baldi III – bass
Jeff Thacher – vocal percussion

Special Appearances
Deahna Baldi
Jesse and Natalie Leonard
Grace and Hope Wright
Debbie and Eli Kerman
Fred Schuchman
Phil Gulotta

Rockapella albums
2002 Christmas albums
Christmas albums by American artists
A cappella Christmas albums